Kadapa Airport  is a regional airport serving Kadapa (formerly Cuddapah) in Andhra Pradesh, India. The upgraded airport was inaugurated on 7 June 2015 by the then Minister of Civil Aviation, Ashok Gajapathi Raju. The terminal building has a capacity to handle 100 peak hour passengers at a time and the apron can accommodate two ATR-72 aircraft.

History

The airport was constructed in 1953, and initially had a  runway. In the 1980s, Vayudoot operated services to Kadapa from Hyderabad. The State Government and the Airports Authority of India (AAI) entered into a memorandum of understanding in March 2007 for developing the existing airports at Kadapa and Warangal to handle ATR-42 and ATR-72 type of aircraft.

In 2009, a new  runway was completed under the Build, Operate and Transfer (BOT) basis at a cost of ₹ 21 crore. In addition, an  compound wall was constructed with an outlay of ₹ 24 crore. In the second phase, an air traffic control building, passenger terminal, parking bays and internal roads were built at a cost of ₹ 13 crore. Other facilities were developed at an estimated cost of ₹ 8 crore.

Scheduled commercial flights to the airport resumed on 7 June 2015 when Air Pegasus launched thrice weekly ATR 72 service to Bengaluru. However, flights were soon cancelled due to poor passenger loads. In April 2016, TruJet introduced flights to Hyderabad, which were too cancelled after a few months.

The airport was one of the 70 airports selected under the government's UDAN scheme to increase regional air connectivity. In March 2017, TruJet reintroduced daily flights to Hyderabad in September 2017, to Mysore via Chennai in November 2017, and to Vijayawada in March 2018. The airport is now connected by IndiGo with Bengaluru, Chennai, Hyderabad, Vijayawada and Visakhapatnam.

Airlines and destinations

Statistics

References

External links
 Cuddapah Airport at the Airports Authority of India

Airports in Andhra Pradesh
Kadapa
Buildings and structures in Kadapa district
Transport in Kadapa district
1953 establishments in India
Airports established in 1953
20th-century architecture in India